Atli Knútsson (born 14 March 1975) is an Icelandic former footballer who played as a goalkeeper. He won his only senior cap for the Iceland national football team on 10 January 2002, coming on as a half-time substitute for Árni Gautur Arason in the 0–1 defeat to Saudi Arabia.

References

Atli Knútsson international appearances at ksi.is

1975 births
Living people
Atli Knutsson
Atli Knutsson
Atli Knutsson
Atli Knutsson
Atli Knutsson
Atli Knutsson
Atli Knutsson